The 2021–22 season is Maccabi Tel Aviv's 115th season since its establishment in 1906 and 74rd since the establishment of the State of Israel. During the 2021–22 campaign, the club will compete in the Israeli Premier League, State Cup, Toto Cup, Israeli Super Cup and Europa Conference League.

Season squad

Israeli Premier League

Regular season

Results summary

Results by matchday

Matches
All times in IST (UTC+3)

Championship round

Results summary

Results by matchday

Matches
All times in IST (UTC+3)

State Cup

Toto Cup

Israeli Super Cup

UEFA Europa Conference League

Qualifying phase

Group stage

Knockout phase

Knockout round play-offs

References

Maccabi Tel Aviv F.C. seasons
Maccabi Tel Aviv
2021–22 UEFA Europa Conference League participants seasons